Kondinsky (masculine), Kondinskaya (feminine), or Kondinskoye (neuter) is the name of several inhabited localities (urban-type settlements and selos) in Russia.

Urban localities
Kondinskoye, Khanty-Mansi Autonomous Okrug, an urban-type settlement in Kondinsky District of Khanty-Mansi Autonomous Okrug

Rural localities
Kondinskoye, Kurgan Oblast, a selo in Kondinsky Selsoviet of Shatrovsky District of Kurgan Oblast